Musak may refer to:

Muzak, a brand of background music
Aisi language, also known as Musak, a Papuan language
Musek, a village in Sarkal Rural District, Marivan County, Kurdistan Province, Iran